Oreophryne geminus is a species of frog in the family Microhylidae.
It is endemic to Papua New Guinea.
Its natural habitat is subtropical or tropical high-altitude grassland.

References

geminus
Amphibians of Papua New Guinea
Taxonomy articles created by Polbot
Amphibians described in 2005